Nour-Eddine Lakhmari is a Moroccan instrumentalist, singer, choreographer and film director.

Biography
Based in Italy, Nour-Eddine has been involved in various groups specializing in ethnic, traditional music of the desert, with whom he has performed both in Italy and abroad. These collaborators include Azahara, Desert Sound and Jajouka.

Also a filmmaker, Nour-Eddine's most famous movie was the award-winning Casanegra.

Career

Discography
 The Music of Morocco

Filmography

 2005: Le regard (The gaze)
 2008: Casanegra
 2012: Zero
 2017: Burnout

External links
 Nour-Eddine Home page and albums

Italian pop musicians
Italian rock musicians
Italian people of Moroccan descent
Living people
1964 births